The 1939 Streatham by-election was held on 7 December 1939.  The by-election was held due to the resignation  of the incumbent Conservative MP, William Lane-Mitchell.  It was won by the Conservative candidate David Robertson.

References

Streatham by-election
Streatham,1939
Streatham by-election
Streatham,1939
Streatham
Unopposed by-elections to the Parliament of the United Kingdom (need citation)